The Virginia Valley League was a minor league baseball league that played the 1910 season. It was a Class D level league, with teams based in Kentucky, Ohio and West Virginia. In 1911, the league evolved to become the Mountain States League.

Cities represented
 Ashland, Kentucky and Catlettsburg, Kentucky: Ashland-Catlettsburg Twins 1910
 Charleston, West Virginia: Charleston Senators 1910
 Huntington, West Virginia: Huntington 1910
 Montgomery, West Virginia: Montgomery Miners 1910
 Parkersburg, West Virginia: Parkersburg Parkers 1910
 Point Pleasant, West Virginia and Gallipolis, Ohio: Point Pleasant-Gallipolis 1910

Standings & statistics

1910 Virginia Valley League
No playoffs scheduled.

References
The Encyclopedia of Minor League Baseball: Second Edition.

External link
Virginia Valley League on baseball-reference.com

Defunct minor baseball leagues in the United States
Baseball leagues in West Virginia
Baseball leagues in Ohio
Baseball leagues in Kentucky
Sports leagues established in 1910
Sports leagues disestablished in 1910
1910 establishments in the United States
1910 disestablishments in the United States